Tara Shanice Moore (born 6 August 1992) is a Hong Kong-born British tennis player. She has a career-high singles ranking of world No. 145, which she achieved on 8 May 2017. She has won nine singles and 17 doubles titles on the ITF Circuit. Her best WTA doubles ranking is No. 77, which she reached on 11 July 2022.

As a junior, she was coached by the American tennis coach, Nick Bollettieri. In September 2006, he referred to Moore as one of the best young players in his school, the Bollettieri Tennis Academy, along with Michelle Larcher de Brito. Her current coach is Charles Homewood. Her favourite surface is stated as being grass although most of her titles to date have come on hardcourt.

Career

2006–2007
Moore's first professional tennis match came in August 2006 at the $10k tournament in Guayaquil, Ecuador. She won two matches to qualify before losing in the first round of the tournament. Moore then moved on to qualify and reach the quarterfinals in only the second ITF tournament of her career in Caracas, Venezuela, another $10k event.

In 2007, Moore reached the quarterfinals of another $10k event in Irapuato before losing to Ana Clara Duarte of Brazil, in straight sets. In July, she entered her first $25k tournament in Felixstowe, England, where she lost in the qualifying stages. Her next two tournaments were both $10k events in England (Ilkley and Wrexham) and she managed to reach the quarterfinal stages of both of these. She ended the year with three consecutive first-round losses at $25k events. Her year-end ranking for 2007 was world No. 823.

2008
April and May resulted in three failures to qualify for ITF tournaments, two of which were $25k events, the other a $50k event. She became a quarterfinalist yet again in her next tournament, the $10k in Izmir, Turkey. She then began a successful grass-court season with a wildcard into the qualifying tournament of Wimbledon where she lost in the first round in a valiant three-set battle against former top-40 player Olga Puchkova of Russia. She followed this up immediately with her first ever semifinal in the $25k tournament held in Felixstowe and continued the momentum in the following tournament ($10k Frinton) where she won, beating fellow teenager Mona Barthel of Germany in the final.

Her next noteworthy result of 2008 came on the ITF Circuit in early November at the $10k event in Sunderland, England. She won through two tough three-set matches in the first and second rounds before winning her quarterfinal match in two sets and coming up against Laura Robson, in one of two all-British semifinals. She lost in straight sets to Robson (who was the eventual champion). Immediately after this was the $10k tournament in Jersey. In the second round of this tournament, she played a rematch of her second-round match in the previous tournament in Sunderland. She beat Tetyana Arefyeva in three sets for the second time in two weeks to reach the quarterfinal stage where she was beaten by Katarzyna Piter. She ended season with a singles ranking of world No. 712.

2009
Moore struggled throughout the year and did not go beyond the quarterfinals in any of the events she competed in. She enjoyed a straight-sets win over former top-20 player Eleni Daniilidou as she qualified for the $50 event in Nottingham. She also competed at the ITF junior events at Roehampton and Wimbledon but lost early in both events as she was drawn against junior world No. 3, Tímea Babos. Post Wimbledon, Moore's best result was qualifying for a $75k event in Shrewsbury before losing to Angelique Kerber. Moore was also asked to leave the Lawn Tennis Association (LTA) National Tennis Centre (NTC) as a result of her perceived lack of professionalism and poor attitude. She would end the year in India before heading back to Hong Kong.

2010
New season started very much as 2009 ended for Moore with early losses in her first handful of events. She was training and working out of Hong Kong, following her expulsion from the LTA although in March, Moore began working with British tennis coach John Morris who was also the coach of Tímea Babos, ranked a lowly 790 on the WTA rankings, Moore moved back to Britain to train at Gosling Tennis Academy under the watchful eye of John Morris. Her results started to pick up in spring time of 2010 as she reached the final of a $10k event in Edinburgh, losing to stable mate Tímea Babos, following this up with her first career top-100 win at the $50k event in Nottingham, beating Chang Kai-chen in three tough sets. During the grass-court season, Moore represented Great Britain in the Maureen Connolly trophy, a sign that the LTA were beginning to see the improvements in Moore both on and off court. This was quickly followed by a wildcard into the ITF junior event at Roehampton where Moore beat world junior No. 1, Daria Gavrilova, 6–0, 6–1, before beating the 2010 Australian Open junior champion, Karolína Plíšková, 6–3, 6–1. But Moore found Karolina's twin sister Kristýna Plíšková too hot to handle as Plíšková achieved a rare double of winning both titles at Roehampton and Wimbledon. On to Wimbledon, Moore had some impressive wins and reached her first Grand Slam quarterfinal where she played fellow Brit Laura Robson and despite controlling much of the match, Moore lost in two sets although she put herself firmly on the tennis map during the grass-court season and credited John Morris for much of the improvements. Post Wimbledon, Moore won her second career title at a $10k event in Chiswick, as well as her first ITF doubles title, alongside Francesca Stephenson, at a $25k in Wrexham, beating Sania Mirza and Emma Laine in the final. She also made the singles quarterfinals in the latter event, with wins over Emilia Baños Gregorians and Manisha Foster. Moore would go on to reach several quarter- and semifinals before ending the year at the $75k event in Dubai. She achieved several career-high rankings through the year and ended 2010 ranked 370. Moore also became a professional in August 2010 when she signed professional terms with London-based management company Global Tennis Connections (GTC), she also signed a long term deal with Adidas International on the back of her upsurge in form and ranking.

2011–2013
Moore was runner-up in the $10k tournament in Sunderland, and won the $10k in Loughborough where she also won the doubles, partnering fellow Brit Francesca Stephenson. She also reached doubles finals in $10k tournaments in Istanbul, partnering Lisa Whybourn, and in Bath, partnering Emma Laine. She ended 2011 with a singles ranking of No. 332.

Moore won no titles in the 2012 season but finished runner-up in singles in the $50k tournament in Kazan, Russia, and in doubles, partnering fellow Brit player Lucy Brown in a $10k event in Antalya, Turkey. However, she improved her ranking throughout the year, and achieved No. 249 in singles.

She started 2013 winning the $10k singles titles in Glasgow and Preston, and following that with the $25k title in Surprise, Arizona. In partnership with compatriot Melanie South, also winning the doubles titles in Glasgow and in the $25k event in Rancho Mirage, California, and ended runner-up in Preston and in Phuket, Thailand.

Moore debuted in top 200 of the singles rankings on 22 April, and made the cut for the Roland Garros qualifying tournament, her first major outside of Wimbledon, where she has played qualifiers courtesy of wildcards. There she lost to seventh seed Sesil Karatancheva, in the first round of qualifying.

On grass in the UK, Moore was awarded a wildcard into the $75k Nottingham Trophy. She reached the second round, beating 143-ranked Slovenian Tadeja Majerič before falling to 110-ranked Hungarian, Melinda Czink. She then received a wildcard into the WTA Tour Birmingham Classic at Edgbaston where she narrowly lost to 12th seeded Kristina Mladenovic in the first round. This followed with a wildcard into Wimbledon in June, where she faced 46-ranked Estonian, Kaia Kanepi, in the first round. Kanepi went on to win in a close three-setter.

Back on the ITF Circuit, Moore reached the finals of both the singles and the doubles tournament of the $25k Woking event on outdoor hardcourt. She lost the singles final to Pemra Özgen in three sets, having held matchpoints. However, she and her Russian partner, Marta Sirotkina, won the doubles, beating Mari Tanaka and Kanae Hisami in the final.

However, in December the LTA cut her funding, citing a lack of results.

2014–2015
In 2014, Moore made her debut for the British Fed Cup team in the ninth/tenth placed playoff against Austria, and won her first singles rubber.

She impressively saw off Tamira Paszek, a former top-30 player. She also played in Wimbledon as a wildcard but lost in the first round to former Wimbledon finalist Vera Zvonareva in a match that spanned two days. Moore failed to build on her Wimbledon performance on her return to ITF Circuit play, as she won just three singles matches in the rest of the year. She saw her ranking slip outside the top 250 in the world as a consequence.

Her poor form continued in 2015. Playing solely at ITF level, Moore's best result was reaching the semifinals of a $10k tournament in Antalya and a $15k event in Loughborough. This was the first year since 2009 that she had failed to make a singles tournament final. She had more success in doubles, reaching three finals and winning the event Antalya in partnership with Cornelia Lister.

First WTA Tour doubles final
Moore's 2016 campaign got off to a bright start, as she won her first tournament of the year, a $10k event in Antalya, beating Anne Schaefer in the final. Following this, Moore and semi-regular doubles partner Conny Perrin played the WTA Tour event in Rio de Janeiro. This was her first WTA event in over two years. Entering would prove a wise choice as Moore and Perrin reached their first ever WTA Tour final, after a run that included a quarterfinal victory over second seeds Marina Erakovic and Sílvia Soler Espinosa. They were beaten by fourth seeds, Verónica Cepede Royg and María Irigoyen, in the title match.

In April 2019, in a match against Jessika Ponchet, Moore was trailing 0–6, 0–5 and facing match point, but made a comeback to win 0–6, 7–6, 6–3.

Personal life
Tara is married to fellow professional tennis player Emina Bektas. She was previously in a long-term relationship with her former doubles partner, Conny Perrin.

WTA career finals

Doubles: 2 (2 runner-ups)

ITF Circuit finals

Singles: 17 (9 titles, 8 runner–ups)

Doubles: 42 (17 titles, 25 runner-ups)

References

External links
 
 
 

1992 births
Living people
LGBT tennis players
British female tennis players
Hong Kong sportspeople
Tennis people from Florida
Lesbian sportswomen